Leonardo Camacho (born 11 February 1957) is a Bolivian wrestler. He competed in the men's freestyle 62 kg at the 1984 Summer Olympics.

References

1957 births
Living people
Bolivian male sport wrestlers
Olympic wrestlers of Bolivia
Wrestlers at the 1984 Summer Olympics
Place of birth missing (living people)